Gevorg Zhorzhiki Karapetyan (born 15 December 1963) is a professional football coach and former player who is the assistant coach of  club Ansar.

Born in Armenia, Karapetyan played as a defender or midfielder. He moved to Lebanon in 1993 and played for the Lebanon national team.

Managerial career 
On 22 March 2021, Karapetyan was announced assistant coach of Ansar. On 5 January 2022, following the resignation of Robert Jaspert, Karapetyan was appointed interim coach of Ansar, leading them in their 2–0 win against Safa four days later.

Career statistics

International
Scores and results list Lebanon's goal tally first, score column indicates score after each Karapetyan goal.

Honours

Player
Homenmen Beirut
 Lebanese Second Division: 2002–03
 Lebanese FA Cup runner-up: 1993–94

Ansar
 Lebanese Premier League: 1997–98, 1998–99
 Lebanese FA Cup: 1998–99; runner-up: 2000–01
 Lebanese Elite Cup: 1997, 2000; runner-up: 1998
 Lebanese Federation Cup: 1999, 2000
 Lebanese Super Cup: 1997, 1998, 1999

Individual
 Lebanese Premier League Team of the Season: 1996–97, 1997–98, 1998–99

See also
 List of Lebanon international footballers born outside Lebanon

References

External links
 
 
 

1963 births
Living people
Soviet Armenians
Armenian footballers
Lebanese footballers
Soviet footballers
Armenian emigrants to Lebanon
Naturalized citizens of Lebanon
Footballers from Yerevan
Association football defenders
Association football midfielders
FC Ararat Yerevan players
FC Kotayk Abovyan players
FC Spitak players
FC Van players
Homenmen Beirut players
Al Ansar FC players
Soviet Top League players
Soviet First League players
Soviet Second League players
Armenian Premier League players
Lebanese Premier League players
Lebanese Second Division players
Lebanon international footballers
Asian Games competitors for Lebanon
Footballers at the 1998 Asian Games
Armenian football managers
Lebanese football managers
Al Ansar FC managers
Lebanese Premier League managers